Ratina may refer to:

Places
Ratina, a suburban community in the municipality of Kraljevo, Serbia
Ratina (district), a district in the city of Tampere, Finland
Ratina (shopping centre), a shopping mall in the district
Ratina Stadium, a multi-purpose stadium in the district

See also
 Raina (disambiguation)
 Retina (disambiguation)